A GABA reuptake inhibitor (GRI) is a type of drug which acts as a reuptake inhibitor for the neurotransmitter gamma-Aminobutyric acid (GABA) by blocking the action of the gamma-Aminobutyric acid transporters (GATs). This in turn leads to increased extracellular concentrations of GABA and therefore an increase in GABAergic neurotransmission.

Indications
GRIs may be used in the clinical treatment of seizures, convulsions, or epilepsy as anticonvulsants/antiepileptics, anxiety disorders such as generalized anxiety disorder (GAD), social phobia (SP) also known as social anxiety disorder (SAD), and panic disorder (PD) as anxiolytics, insomnia as hypnotics, muscle tremors or spasms as muscle relaxants, and chronic pain as analgesics. They may also potentially be used as anesthetics in surgery.

Effects

GRIs can induce a wide range of psychological and physiological effects, including: 
 
 general and subjective alteration in consciousness
 dizziness
 blurry vision
 diplopia or double vision
 nystagmus or involuntary eye movements
 amblyopia or "lazy eye"
 tinnitus or "ear ringing"
 sedation
 drowsiness or somnolence
 narcolepsy
 tiredness or weakness
 fatigue or lethargy
 aches and pains
 headache
 nausea and vomiting
 gastrointestinal disturbances
 shakiness
 disorientation
 diminished awareness
 impaired attention
 focus and concentration
 decreased drive and motivation
 stuttering and slurring of speech
 confusion
 cognitive and memory impairment
 mood lift or drop
 depression
 anxiolysis
 disinhibition
 stress reduction
 euphoria or dysphoria
 irritability
 aggression
 anger or rage
 increased appetite and subsequent weight gain
 ataxia or impaired coordination and balance
 muscle relaxation
 trembling or muscle tremors and spasms
 paresthesia or "pins and needles"
 analgesia
 respiratory depression
 dyspnea or shortness of breath

Many of these properties are dependent on whether the GRI in question is capable of crossing the blood-brain-barrier (BBB). Those that do not will only produce peripheral effects.

GRIs such as CI-966 have been characterized as hallucinogens with effects analogous to those of the GABAA receptor agonist muscimol (a constituent of Amanita muscaria (fly agaric) mushrooms) when administered at sufficient doses.

Overdose
At very high doses characterized by overdose, a number of symptoms may come to prominence, including: 
 
 severe cognitive deficit to the point of acute retardation
 anterograde or retrograde amnesia
 drooling
 piloerection or "goose bumps"
 agitation or restlessness
 flailing
 thrashing and screaming
 unintentional or accidental injury
 delirium
 hallucinations
 myoclonus
 dystonia
 paralysis
 stupor
 faintness or loss of consciousness
 seizures or convulsions
 status epilepticus
 coma and respiratory arrest or cessation of breathing
 brain damage
 death

List of GRIs

 CI-966
 Deramciclane (EGIS-3886)
 Gabaculine
 Guvacine (C10149)
 Nipecotic acid
 NNC 05-2090
 NNC-711
 SKF-89976A
 SNAP-5114
 Tiagabine (Gabitril)
 Hyperforin

See also
 GABAergic
 Reuptake inhibitor

References